Sons of Day, stylized as SONSOFDAY, is an American, alternative rock band based out of Portland, Oregon, consisting of three brothers: Vladimir (lead vocals), Roman (guitar), and Scott Belonozhko (bass).

History
Born in the Ukrainian town Zvenyhorodka, the Belonozhko family immigrated to the United States in 1992 in pursuit of a better life and religious freedom. The band was formed in 2005 by Roman, the oldest of the three brothers, and they released their first EP in 2005.

In 2007, Sons of Day released their full-length album entitled Fragile People. Soon after, the band began travelling extensively, playing concerts, festivals, benefit shows and managed to get radio play in various cities. The following year, they took first place at the Creation Festival indie band talent search, and their video "This Place" was voted best Pop Music Video of 2008 on the Gospel Music Channel.

Sons of Day released their second full-length studio album, Autumn Heart, in October 2009 via 1964 Records, and the band continues to travel throughout the country playing concerts and festivals.

Band members
Roman Belonozhko - Lead Guitar
Billy Morin - Vocals, Lead Guitar
Vlad Belonozhko - Lead Vocals, Guitar
Scott Belonozhko -  Bass

Discography
2007: Fragile People
2009: Autumn Heart

References

External links
Official website
Official Facebook

Alternative rock groups from Oregon
Musical groups established in 2005
Musical groups from Portland, Oregon
2005 establishments in Oregon